Matrix metalloproteinase-19 (MMP-19) also known as matrix metalloproteinase RASI is an enzyme that in humans is encoded by the MMP19 gene.

Function 

Proteins of the matrix metalloproteinase (MMP) family are involved in the breakdown of extracellular matrix in normal physiological processes, such as embryonic development, reproduction, and tissue remodeling, as well as in disease processes, such as arthritis and metastasis. Most MMP's are secreted as inactive proproteins which are activated when cleaved by extracellular proteinases. This protein is expressed in human epidermis and endothelial cells and it has a role in cellular proliferation, migration, angiogenesis and adhesion. Multiple transcript variants encoding distinct isoforms have been identified for this gene.

References

Further reading

External links
 The MEROPS online database for peptidases and their inhibitors: M10.021

Matrix metalloproteinases
EC 3.4.24